Gordon Donald Innes (8 October 1910 – 6 November 1992) was a New Zealand rugby union and professional rugby league footballer who played in the 1920s and 1930s.

Early life
Gordon Innes was born in Dunedin, New Zealand, he was a pupil of Christchurch Boys' High School, and he died aged 82 in Christchurch, New Zealand.

Rugby union career
He played 31 matches in the second five-eighth (inside-centre) position for Canterbury, and seven matches (including two test matches) for New Zealand on the 1932 New Zealand rugby union tour of Australia.

Rugby league career

International honours
Gordon Innes played left-, i.e. number 4, in English/Rugby League XIII's 25–18 victory over France at Headingley Rugby Stadium, Leeds on Monday 6 May 1935.

County League appearances
Gordon Innes played in Castleford's victory in the Yorkshire County League during the 1938–39 season.

County Cup Final appearances
Gordon Innes played right-, i.e. number 3, and scored a try played in Wigan's 12–21 defeat by Salford in the 1934 Lancashire County Cup Final during the 1934–35 season at Station Road, Swinton on Saturday 20 October 1934.

Club career

References

External links
 (archived by web.archive.org) The History of the Christchurch High School Old Boys' RFC
 Statistics at wigan.rlfans.com 
Gordon Innes Memory Box Search at archive.castigersheritage.com

1910 births
1992 deaths
Canterbury rugby union players
Castleford Tigers players
Dual-code rugby internationals
New Zealand international rugby union players
New Zealand rugby league players
New Zealand rugby union players
People educated at Christchurch Boys' High School
Rugby league centres
Rugby league players from Dunedin
Rugby League XIII players
Rugby union centres
Rugby union players from Dunedin
Wigan Warriors players